The Women's downhill competition of the Lake Placid 1980 Olympics was held at  on Sunday, 

The defending world champion was Annemarie Moser-Pröll of Austria, who was also the defending World Cup downhill champion, while Switzerland's Marie-Theres Nadig led the current season. Defending Olympic champion Rosi Mittermaier retired four years earlier.

Moser-Pröll won the gold, Hanni Wenzel of Liechtenstein took the silver, and Nadig was the bronze medalist.

Results
The race was started at 11:30 local time, (UTC −5).

References 

Women's downhill
Alp
Oly